Hadesina divisa is a moth of the family Notodontidae first described by Paul Dognin in 1902. It is found in Colombia.

References

Moths described in 1902
Notodontidae of South America